Investigation or Investigations may refer to:

Law enforcement
 Investigation, the work of a detective
 Investigation, the work of a private investigator
 Criminal investigation, the study of facts, used to identify, locate and prove the guilt of an accused criminal
 Criminal investigation department, the branch of British Police force to which plainclothes detectives belong
 Federal Bureau of Investigation, the primary investigative arm of the US Department of Justice
 Tax investigation

Medicine
 Clinical trial, an investigation conducted to collect data for new drugs or devices
 Investigational New Drug, a category in a USFDA program
 Outbreak Investigation

Science and maths
 Forensic science investigation, in fields such as accounting, science, engineering and information technology
 Investigations in Numbers, Data, and Space, a K-5 mathematics curriculum

Arts, entertainment, and media

Literature
 The Investigation, a 1959 book by Stanisław Lem
 The Investigation (play), a 1965 play by Peter Weiss

Television
 "Investigations" (Star Trek: Voyager), an episode of the television series Star Trek: Voyager
 Investigation (TV channel), a Canadian French-language specialty channel
 The Investigation (TV series), a 2020 six-part Danish TV series
 Investigation Discovery, a digital cable channel

Other uses in arts, entertainment, and media
 Investigate (magazine), a New Zealand current affairs magazine
 Investigation (film), a 2006 Bulgarian drama
 Investigative journalism, the practice of in-depth reporting or analysis
 Temporal Investigations, an agency of the government of the United Federation of Planets in the fictional universe of Star Trek

See also
 
 Discovery (observation), the act of detecting something new, or something "old" that had been unrecognized as meaningful
 Examination (disambiguation)
 Forensic science, in fields such as accounting, science, engineering and information technology
 Investigator (disambiguation)
 Research